Jerry Gustafson is a former American football quarterback who played one season with the BC Lions of the Canadian Football League. He was drafted by the San Francisco 49ers in the twenty-seventh round of the 1956 NFL Draft. He played college football at Stanford University and attended Astoria High School in Astoria, Oregon.

External links
Just Sports Stats
Fanbase profile

Possibly living people
Year of birth missing (living people)
Players of American football from Oregon
American football quarterbacks
Canadian football quarterbacks
American players of Canadian football
Stanford Cardinal football players
BC Lions players
People from Astoria, Oregon